El Coco may refer to:
Aeropuerto Internacional el Coco, the former name of Juan Santamaría International Airport in Costa Rica
Coco (folklore)
El Coco, Coclé, Panama
El Coco, Panamá Oeste, Panama
El Coco, recording artists for AVI Records, of American Variety International.